Diocese of New Westminster may refer to:
 Anglican Diocese of New Westminster
 Ukrainian Catholic Eparchy of New Westminster
 Roman Catholic Diocese of New Westminster, the former name for the current Roman Catholic Diocese of Vancouver